Feroz V Rasheed is an Indian cricketer, who has played in 68 first-class matches between 1989 and 1998. Rasheed, an all-rounder, was a prominent player for Kerala in the 90's. Rasheed was Kerala's captain when they qualified for the Ranji Trophy Super League, after emerging as the south zone winners in the 1996-97 season.

Rasheed was also a Ranji Trophy selector, as well as the selector for Uttarakhand's U-16, U-19 and U-23 teams.

References

External links
 

1969 births
Living people
Kerala cricketers
Indian cricketers
South Zone cricketers
Cricketers from Kochi